is a Japanese actor, talent and fashion model. He was born in Sakai, Osaka, Japan. Currently, he is employed by the Top Coat subsidiary of Watanabe Productions.  Since debuting in 2005's Nobuta wo Produce, he has appeared in many Japanese dramas, movies, variety shows and on stage.

Filmography

Television

Movies

Videogames

References

External links 
Agency Profile
Official Website
Official Blog

1986 births
Japanese male film actors
Japanese male television actors
Living people
Male actors from Tokyo
People from Sakai, Osaka
21st-century Japanese male actors